Janko Vukotić (18 February 1866 – 4 February 1927) was a Montenegrin serdar, general in the armies of the Principality and Kingdom of Montenegro in the Balkan Wars and World War I.

Biography

Vukotić was born in Čevo, belonging to the Vukotić brotherhood; he was related to Petar and Milena Vukotić. He studied at the lower gymnasium at Cetinje, and at the Military Academy of Modena in Italy.

Politics
Vukotić served as Minister of Defence of Kingdom of Montenegro in the periods of 1905–1907, 1911–1912 and 1913–1915, and as Prime Minister of Montenegro in 1913–1915.

Balkan Wars
Vukotić commanded the Montenegrin Eastern Army during the First Balkan War and the Montenegrin division of the First Serbian Army during the Second Balkan War, in which he distinguished himself at the Battle of Bregalnica.

World War I
During the First World War, Vukotić was the Chief of Staff of the Montenegrin Army and the Commander of the Sandžak Army of Montenegrin forces. He is most famous for winning the Battle of Mojkovac, in which his daughter, the only female participant, Vasilija Vukotić was assigned to his headquarters to conduct correspondence. Despite frequent writings, he was not taken prisoner after the fall of Montenegro in January 1916. According to information from his son, Vukasin Vukotic, after the fall of Montenegro, a treaty was signed with the Austrians and the Montenegrins went home. Later there were uprisings in the north, attacks on Austrian troops and slaying of Austrian officers. When they requested he subside the attacks of komits in the north who assaulted Austrian officers, he refused explaining that they had a right to do so because the Austrians were occupants. He was interned - house arrest with his family - in Bjelovar because he refused to cooperate with the Austrian authorities. In his free time there he wrote his memoirs, the text beginning with: "Today in Bjelovar..."

Later years
After the war, Vukotić served as a general in the Royal Yugoslav Army until his death in 1927. He is interred in the Belgrade New Cemetery.

References

Sources

 

1866 births
1927 deaths
Military personnel from Cetinje
19th-century military history of Montenegro
20th-century military history of Montenegro
People of the Principality of Montenegro
People of the Kingdom of Montenegro
Politicians from Cetinje
Montenegrin soldiers
Serbs of Montenegro
Dukes of Montenegro
20th-century Serbian people
Serbian military leaders
Serbian military personnel of the Balkan Wars
Serbian military personnel of World War I
Montenegrin military personnel of the Balkan Wars
Montenegrin military personnel of World War I
World War I prisoners of war held by Austria-Hungary
Companions of the Order of St Michael and St George
Burials at Belgrade New Cemetery
Defence ministers of Montenegro